Tiurana is a municipality in the  comarca of Noguera, in the province of Lleida, Catalonia, Spain.

It is home to a late-Gothic parish church, built in 1545. Outside the hamlet is a Romanesque hermitage dedicate to St. Ermengol.

The economy is based on agriculture (wheat, potatoes, alfalfa, and vegetables).

References

External links
Official website 
 Government data pages 

Municipalities in Noguera (comarca)
Populated places in Noguera (comarca)